Michael Hatz (born 17 November 1970, in Vienna) is a retired Austrian international footballer.

Honours
 Rapid Wien
 Austrian Football Bundesliga:
1995–96
 Austrian Cup:
1995
 UEFA Cup Winners' Cup:
1996 runner-up
 UEFA Intertoto Cup:
1992, 1993

References

1970 births
Living people
Austrian footballers
Austria international footballers
SK Rapid Wien players
A.C. Reggiana 1919 players
U.S. Lecce players
FC Admira Wacker Mödling players
Serie A players
Serie B players
Austrian Football Bundesliga players
Austrian expatriate footballers
Expatriate footballers in Italy

Association football defenders